The Jingle Bell Ball is a concert held annually in December since 2008 (except for 2020 because of the COVID-19 pandemic), by the radio station Capital FM at The O2. Artists that have headlined the concert include Katy Perry, Taylor Swift, Little Mix, Justin Bieber, Ed Sheeran, The Black Eyed Peas, Coldplay, Stormzy, Lady Gaga, Girls Aloud, Kylie Minogue, Dua Lipa and Janet Jackson. A portion of ticket sales profit is donated to Global's Make Some Noise, Capital's flagship charity, formerly known as Help a Capital Child and Help a London Child.

2008
Unlike following years, the 2008 festival was held on one night only Wednesday, 10 December 2008. The Evening Standard rated it three stars, saying it was "too quick to be boring but too superficial to stick in the mind".

Line up
Following are the acts that performed. Headliners are shown in bold.

2009
 
The 2009 event was held on Saturday and Sunday, 5–6 December 2009.

Line up
Headliners are shown in bold.

Acts that performed on Saturday, 5 December, were as follows:

Acts that performed on Sunday, 6 December, were as follows:

Setlists 
Saturday, 5 December

2010
Capital's Jingle Bell Ball 2010 was held on Saturday and Sunday, 4–5 December 2010.

Line up
Headliners are shown in bold.

Acts that performed on Saturday, 4 December, were as follows:

Acts that performed on Sunday, 5 December, were as follows:

Cee Lo Green was originally scheduled to perform on Saturday, however, due to snow, his flight was rescheduled and he performed on Sunday.

2011
The 2011 event was held on Saturday and Sunday, 3–4 December 2011. It was announced by Capital on 28 October. Capital also confirmed that Olly Murs would be the first act for the Saturday performance. Tickets for the concert on Saturday were released on 31 October at 08:00 and sold out in just over three hours.

Line up
Headliners are shown in bold.

Acts that performed on Saturday, 3 December, were as follows:

Acts that performed on Sunday, 4 December, were as follows:

2012 
The 2012 event took place on Saturday and Sunday, 8–9 December 2012.

Little Mix performed as a three-piece, as member Perrie Edwards was unwell. Capital Breakfast presenters Dave Berry and Lisa Snowdon hosted the ball on both nights. For the first time, televised highlights of the event were shown on Capital TV.

Line up
Headliners are shown in bold.

Acts that performed on Saturday, 8 December, were as follows:

Acts that performed on Sunday, 9 December, were as follows:

Setlists 
Saturday, 8 DecemberSunday, 9 December

2013 

The 2013 Jingle Bell Ball was held at The O2 Arena on Saturday and Sunday, 7–8 December 2013. On Saturday night, Katy Perry was the main headliner, with Tinie Tempah and Ellie Goulding as supporting headliners. On Sunday, Lady Gaga was the main headliner, with Dizzee Rascal and Jessie J supporting. 
Dave Berry and Lisa Snowdon (Capital Breakfast hosts) hosted the ball on both nights, alongside Pandora. Meanwhile, Rich Clarke, Kat Shoob, James 'The Bassman' Bassam, and Greg Burns hosted on the radio throughout both nights.

Line up
Headliners are shown in bold.

Acts that performed on Saturday, 7 December, were as follows:

Acts that performed on Sunday, 8 December, were as follows:

Setlists 
Saturday, 7 DecemberSunday, 8 December

2014 
The 2014 Jingle Bell Ball was held at London's O2 Arena on Saturday and Sunday, 6–7 December 2014, with acts such as OneRepublic, Ed Sheeran, Sam Smith and Jessie J performing. The first tickets for the show were given away as part of Global's first ever Make Some Noise day on 8 October, although, at the time, the dates for the event were not confirmed. It was confirmed on Capital FM on 20 October that the Jingle Bell Ball would be returning, sponsored by Morrisons Supermarket. All information on the ball was announced on 3 November 2014. Tickets for general release went on sale on 7 November. Tickets for both dates sold out in under an hour, which is a record.

5 Seconds of Summer performed at the event as a three-piece as band member Michael Clifford was unable to fly out due to the loss of his passport.

Line up
Headliners are shown in bold.

Acts that performed on Saturday, 6 December, were as follows:

Acts that performed on Sunday, 7 December, were as follows:

Setlists 
Saturday, 6 DecemberSunday, 7 December

2015
Dave Berry and Lisa Snowdon revealed that 2015's event would once again be hosted at London's O2 Arena on Saturday and Sunday, 5–6 December, during Capital Breakfast on 2 November. For the first time since 2013, the sponsor was Coca-Cola. Tickets were released on 5 November, with pre-sales occurring in the week leading up to it. Both headliners were announced on Friday, 6 November, on Capital Breakfast. On 23 November, Tinie Tempah and Katy B were added to the line-up, whilst Carly Rae Jepsen was added the following day. For the first time, Little Mix performed for both nights. Ariana Grande was supposed to perform on Saturday but withdrew for unknown reasons. Marvin Humes confirmed via Twitter he was doing a pre-show DJ Set on both days. On 5 December, Coldplay was the headliners and Justin Bieber was the headliner on 6 December.

Line up
Headliners are shown in bold.

Acts that performed on Saturday, 5 December, were as follows:

Acts that performed on Sunday, 6 December, were as follows:

Setlists

Introductory DJ set (for both nights)

Saturday, 5 DecemberSunday, 6 December

2016
The 2016 Jingle Bell Ball was held on Saturday and Sunday, 3–4 December 2016. The line-up was announced on 7–8 November. Tickets went on sale on 10 November at 8am and sold out in less than an hour. On 28 November, Anne-Marie, Sean Paul and Calum Scott were added to Night 1. On 29 November Sigma were added to Night 2. Capital FM confirmed via Twitter that Marvin Humes would open night one. Videos of the weekend were put on Capital FM's YouTube channel. Little Mix was announced as a headliner for the first time.

Line up
Headliners are shown in bold.

Acts that performed on Saturday, 3 December, were as follows:

Acts that performed on Sunday, 4 December, were as follows:

Setlists

Introductory DJ set (for both nights)

Saturday, 3 DecemberSunday, 4 December

2017
On 30 October 2017, during Capital Breakfast, Roman Kemp confirmed that the Jingle Bell Ball would run on Saturday and Sunday, 9–10 December 2017 at The O2 Arena. On 6 November Roman Kemp and Vick Hope confirmed the line-up for night one and on 7 November the line-up for night two was revealed.

Major Lazer performed as a duo as Jillionaire did not turn up for unknown reasons.

Sean Paul didn't perform with Anne-Marie and Dua Lipa.

Clean Bandit didn't perform with Anne-Marie.

Line up
Headliners are shown in bold.

Acts that performed on Saturday, 9 December, were as follows:

Acts that performed on Sunday, 10 December, were as follows:

Setlists

Introductory DJ set (for both nights)

Saturday, 9 DecemberSunday, 10 December

2018 
The 2018 Jingle Bell Ball took place on Saturday and Sunday, 8–9 December 2018 at The O2 Arena.

Capital Breakfast presenters Roman Kemp, Vick Hope, and Sonny Jay hosted the event on both nights. The line up was announced by the hosts on the Breakfast Show during the week of 5 November. For the first time since 2011, highlights of the event were not shown on Capital TV as it shut down on 10 October 2018, so highlights were only available on Capital FM and its website and Sky One. Loud Luxury was added to the night 1 line up.

Line up
Headliners are shown in bold.

Acts that performed on Saturday, 8 December, were as follows:

Acts that performed on Sunday, 9 December, were as follows:

Setlists

Introductory DJ set (for both nights) 

Saturday, 8 DecemberSunday, 9 December

2019 
The 2019 Jingle Bell Ball took place on Saturday and Sunday, 7–8 December 2019 at The O2 Arena in Greenwich, London. This year's Jingle Bell Ball was sponsored by SEAT.

Capital FM presenters Will Manning & Aimee Vivian hosted both nights. The line-up was announced everyday from Monday, 4 November to Thursday, 7 November 2019 on the Breakfast show live from Leicester Square in Central London. Tickets went on sale on Thursday, 7 November 2019 at 8am GMT, right after the exclusive pre-sale via Global Player and O2 Priority. Between 4 and 5 November 2019, Jax Jones, Sigala and Ella Henderson joined Kemp, Hope and Jay to help announce the rest of the line-up for both nights. Tickets were officially sold out in just over an hour, which led to their dealing through Capital's on-air competitions. Due to Roman Kemp being confirmed as one of twelve I'm a Celebrity...Get Me Out of Here! contestants, Will Manning hosted the event alongside Aimee Vivian. The show started at 6:30pm GMT each night and performances and backstage videos can be found on @CapitalOfficial and #CapitalJBB on Instagram, Twitter, Snapchat, Facebook, YouTube and TikTok. Sky One will also show TV highlights from both nights of the Ball throughout the festive season. Stormzy closed night 1 (Saturday 7 December 2019) and Taylor Swift closed night 2 (Sunday 8 December 2019). Liam Payne opened night 1, whilst Anne-Marie opened night 2. Capital Late Show presenter Marvin Humes did a Capital Weekender DJ Set at 6:15pm GMT. It was also confirmed that due to being in Australia, cheering on Roman Kemp, Sonny Jay missed both nights of the ball and therefore didn't present the show.

The radio schedule for both nights was follows:

 9am- 12pm - Rob Howard
 12pm - 3pm - Aimee Vivian
 3pm - 6pm - Will Manning
 6pm - 10pm - Capital's Jingle Bell Ball live

Line-up. 
Headliners are shown in bold.

Acts that performed on Saturday, 7 December, were as follows:

Acts that performed on Sunday, 8 December, were as follows:

Setlists

Introductory DJ set (for both nights)

Saturday, 7 December

Sunday, 8 December

2020 

Due to the COVID-19 pandemic, the Jingle Bell Ball did not take place at the O2 Arena this year, but Roman Kemp (along with Sian Welby and Sonny Jay) announced on Capital Breakfast on Thursday 26 November that they were doing a Best Of Show sponsored by Barclaycard on Thursday 10 December at 7pm. The show was broadcast on YouTube, Sky One, Global Player and on Capital Radio.

2021 

The 2021 Jingle Bell Ball took place on Saturday and Sunday, 11–12 December 2021 at The O2 at Greenwich Peninsula, London. This year's Jingle Bell Ball was sponsored by Barclaycard. This was the first Jingle Bell Ball since 2019 due to the impact of the COVID-19 pandemic on the music industry which cancelled the 2020 Jingle Bell Ball. The Ball was announced by Rob Howard and Lauren Layfeild in for Roman, Sonny and Sian, on Friday, 29 October 2021 at 8am during Capital Breakfast

Capital Breakfast presenters Roman Kemp, Siân Welby and Sonny Jay hosted both nights. The line-up was announced on Wednesday 3 and Thursday 4 November from 8am  on the Breakfast show live from Leicester Square in Central London via interactive billboards founded by the listeners. Tickets went on sale on Friday, 5 November 2021 at 9am with a VIP Pre-Sale starting on Thursday 4 November 2021 at 9:30am

This was  Welby's first time hosting a Jingle Bell Ball after former co-host Vick Hope left the Capital Breakfast show in 2020. 
 
The show will start 6:30pm GMT each night and performances and backstage videos can be found on @CapitalOfficial and #CapitalJBB on Instagram, Twitter, Snapchat, Facebook, YouTube and TikTok. Sky Max & Sky Showcase will also show TV highlights from both nights of the Ball throughout the festive season. 
 
The radio schedule for both nights will be as follows:
 9am- 12pm - Rob Howard & Lauren Layfield
 12pm - 3pm - Roman Kemp, Siân Welby & Sonny Jay
 3pm - 6pm - Will Manning & Aimee Vivian
 6pm - 11pm - Capital's Jingle Bell Ball with Barclaycard: LIVE NIGHT 1 (SATURDAY) 
 11pm-1:30am - Capital’s Jingle Bell Ball After-Party with Coco Cole (SATURDAY) 
 6pm - 10:30pm - Capital's Jingle Bell Ball with Barclaycard: LIVE NIGHT 2 (SUNDAY) 
 10:30pm - 1am - All the gloss from Capital’s Jingle Bell Ball with Kamilla Rose (SUNDAY)

On Saturday, 11 December 2021, it was announced that Coldplay and Lil Nas X, who were originally scheduled to play on the first and second nights respectively, had to pull out due to members of their team getting COVID-19. It was announced ArrDee and Tom Grennan would be added to the lineup, with ArrDee performing on both nights, whilst Tom Grennan would just be doing the Saturday. It was also announced Justin Bieber and Ed Sheeran would both be extending their sets.

On Sunday 12 December, it was announced that Mabel would not be performing for the same reason. Grennan performed on the second night as a result of this.

Line-up 
Headliners are shown in bold.

Saturday

Acts that will perform on Sunday, 12 December, will be as follows:

Sunday

2022 
The Jingle Bell Ball was announced during Capital Breakfast on 4 November 2022 and it was announced that Barclaycard would sponsor the Ball again. The line-up for the first night was announced at 7am GMT on 7 November 2022, while the line-up for the second night was announced on 8 November 2022 at 7am GMT. The Jingle Bell Ball was held at The O2 Arena at Greenwich Peninsula in Greater London on 10 December 2022 and 11 December 2022. There was a pre-sale for Capital VIP members on 8 November 2022 and then the general sale happened on 9 November 2022 via Global Player from 9am GMT. 

Both nights of the Jingle Bell Ball were hosted by Roman Kemp, Siân Welby, Sonny Jay and Chris Stark. The Ball started at 6:30pm GMT will ended at 10:30pm GMT on both nights. Performances and backstage videos could be found on @CapitalOfficial and #CapitalJBB on Instagram, Twitter, Snapchat, Facebook, YouTube and TikTok. 

This was Stark's first Jingle Bell Ball since joining the Breakfast Show in October 2022 and Jay's last Jingle Bell Ball after left the Breakfast Show to replace Marvin Humes on the Capital from 10pm-1am each weekday evening.

The Ball also has a new logo for this year after Capital changed its logo in November 2022.

This was the first time the Jingle Bell Ball was held during a FIFA World Cup as the 2022 FIFA World Cup was still happening during Night 1 with England playing France in the Quarter-finals at the Al Bayt Stadium in Al Khor, Qatar with kick-off at 7pm GMT.

On 10 December 2022, it was announced that Tom Grennan would open Night 1 with his set starting at 6:25pm GMT and that Coldplay would close Night 1 with their set starting at 9:45pm GMT. On 11 December 2022, it was announced that Dua Lipa would open Night 2 with her starting at 6:25pm GMT and that Stormzy would close Night 2 with his set starting at 9:45pm GMT.

The radio schedule for the ball dates were as follows: 

Saturday 

 1-5am: Chris Ros

 5-9am: Niall Gray

 9am-12pm: Aimee Vivian and Jay London LIVE Backstage at Capital’s Jingle Bell Ball

 12pm-3pm: Roman, Siân, Sonny & Chris LIVE Backstage at Capital’s Jingle Bell Ball

 3pm-6pm: Rio Fredrika and Jimmy Hill LIVE Backstage at Capital’s Jingle Bell Ball 

 6pm-11pm: Capital’s Jingle Bell Ball with Ant Payne 

 11pm-1am: The Capital Weekender with Charlie Powell

Sunday 

 1-5am: Chris Ros

 5-9am: Niall Gray

 9am-12pm: Aimee Vivian and Jay London LIVE Backstage at Capital’s Jingle Bell Ball

 12pm-3pm: Roman, Siân, Sonny & Chris LIVE Backstage at Capital’s Jingle Bell Ball

 3pm-6pm: Rio Fredrika and Jimmy Hill LIVE Backstage at Capital’s Jingle Bell Ball 

 6pm-10:30pm: Capital’s Jingle Bell Ball with Ant Payne 

 10:30pm-4am: Jingle Bell Ball Afterparty with Kamilla Rose & Kemi Rodgers

Line-up 
Headliners are shown in bold.

Pre-show Acts (for both nights)

Saturday 10 December 2022

Sunday 11 December 2022

Most frequent performers 
Bold indicates they headlined a night of ball that year.
Italics indicates they were a special guest or surprise act that year.

Sponsors 
The first concert in 2008 was sponsored by Zavvi. In 2009 Windows 7 became the sponsor, in conjunction with the buildup for the operating system's launch. The sponsorship continued through 2011. During their sponsorship of the event, prizes including thousands of tickets to the ball, laptops, holidays, games consoles, smartphones and money were given away on air.

In 2012, BlackBerry sponsored the concert in a last-minute deal. In 2013 and 2015–2018, the event was sponsored by Coca-Cola. Morrisons Supermarket was the sponsor in 2014. SEAT sponsored the concert in 2019. In 2020, Barclaycard announced a 3 year sponsorship deal with Global resulting in Barclaycard sponsoring the 2020 livestream, and both the 2021 and 2022 shows.

See also 

Summertime Ball
Capital London
Capital
Global Radio

References

External links 

Jingle Bell Ball at Capital

Music festivals in London
Capital (radio network)